Daniel Scott Taylor (born 17 March 1993) is an English footballer who plays for Spennymoor Town in the Northern League.

Career
Born in Newcastle upon Tyne, Taylor joined the academy setup at Newcastle United in 2010 as a scholar. In the summer of 2011, he signed his first professional contract.

Oldham Athletic
On 18 June 2012, he joined Football League One side Oldham Athletic on a one-year deal, after being recommended by Peter Beardsley. His professional debut for Oldham came on 18 August 2011, in a 2–0 defeat to Milton Keynes Dons, replacing Jordan Slew as a substitute. He scored his first goal for the club against Crewe Alexandra on Boxing Day 2012 after coming on as a substitute.

Taylor was released by the club at the end of the 2012–13 season, after only managing to make several substitute appearances during his time with the club.

References

External links
 
 Ashington stats at Ashington AFC

1993 births
Footballers from Newcastle upon Tyne
Living people
English footballers
Association football forwards
Newcastle United F.C. players
Ashington A.F.C. players
Oldham Athletic A.F.C. players
English Football League players
Spennymoor Town F.C. players